Castelletto d'Orba is a comune (municipality) in the Province of Alessandria in the Italian region Piedmont, located about  southeast of Turin and about  south of Alessandria.  

Castelletto d'Orba borders the following municipalities: Capriata d'Orba, Lerma, Montaldeo, San Cristoforo, and Silvano d'Orba.

References

Cities and towns in Piedmont